Samson Mbingui (born 9 February 1992) is a Gabonese professional footballer who plays for the Gabon national football team.

Mbingui was a member of the Gabon national under-23 football team at the 2011 CAF U-23 Championship and the 2012 Summer Olympics.

References

External links
 

Living people
1992 births
People from Moanda
Association football midfielders
Gabonese footballers
Algerian Ligue Professionnelle 1 players
Ligue 2 players
Championnat National players
Championnat National 3 players
MC Alger players
MC El Eulma players
Raja CA players
Tours FC players
2011 CAF U-23 Championship players
2015 Africa Cup of Nations players
2017 Africa Cup of Nations players
Expatriate footballers in Algeria
Expatriate footballers in Morocco
Expatriate footballers in France
Footballers at the 2012 Summer Olympics
Gabon international footballers
Gabonese expatriate footballers
Olympic footballers of Gabon
Gabonese expatriate sportspeople in Algeria
Gabonese expatriate sportspeople in Morocco
Gabonese expatriate sportspeople in France
21st-century Gabonese people